Gene Mayer was the defending champion of the singles event at the ABN World Tennis Tournament, but lost in the quarterfinals to Jimmy Connors. The final between first-seeded Ivan Lendl and second-seeded Jimmy Connors was halted at 6–0, 1–0 because the Ahoy Arena had received an anonymous telephone bomb threat. The police evacuated the stands and searched the venue but no bomb was found. The match was not resumed and officially has no winner.

Seeds

Draw

Finals

 * Final unfinished due to a bomb scare. Ivan Lendl and Jimmy Connors both received Runners-up finishes.

Upper half

Lower half

References

External links
 ITF tournament edition details

1984 ABN World Tennis Tournament